Yongguang Zhang from Microsoft Research Asia, China was named Fellow of the Institute of Electrical and Electronics Engineers (IEEE) in 2014 for contributions to software radio technology. He received his Ph.D. in computer science from Purdue University in 1994. From 2001 to 2003, he was  an adjunct assistant professor of computer science at the University of Texas at Austin. He is an associate editor for IEEE Transactions on Mobile Computing, an area editor for MC2R, was a guest editor for ACM MONET Journal.

References

External links

20th-century births
Living people
Chinese computer scientists
Purdue University alumni
University of Texas at Austin faculty
Fellow Members of the IEEE
Year of birth missing (living people)
Place of birth missing (living people)